The Farglory U-Town is a skyscraper complex located in Xizhi District, New Taipei, Taiwan.

As of December 2020, they are the tallest buildings in Xizhi District, 10th tallest in New Taipei City and 35th tallest in Taiwan.

Floors B1 to 3 of the buildings house the IFG Farglory Square, a large shopping mall. Floor 4 houses the U-Museum and floors 5 to 37 are office buildings.

Location
The location of the complex is opposite to the Oriental Science Park and in close proximity to the Xike railway station.

Gallery

See also 
 List of tallest buildings in Taiwan
 List of tallest buildings in New Taipei City
 IFG Farglory Square

References

External links

 Official Website of Farglory U-Town

2015 establishments in Taiwan
Skyscraper office buildings in New Taipei
Office buildings completed in 2015